Daniel Boone Hotel is a historic hotel located at Charleston, West Virginia. It is a Classical Revival Style ten story structure with blond brick exterior and tan, modular, stone-looking terra cotta. The building was originally constructed in 1927–29, expanded in 1936 and again in 1949 to provide a total of 465 rooms, a large ballroom and 3 parlor meeting rooms.  The overall effect of the facade is to create the common early 20th Century "Skyscraper" look of "Base", two story mezzanine - "Shaft" five stories of 1/1 and 1 story of 6/6 windows - and "Capital" tenth story diamond brick and terra cotta balustrade.  The building is "U"-shaped in plan.  In the early-1980s the building was extensively renovated to become an office building.

It was listed on the National Register of Historic Places in 1984.

References

Hotel buildings completed in 1929
Buildings and structures in Charleston, West Virginia
Neoclassical architecture in West Virginia
Defunct hotels in West Virginia
Hotels established in 1929
Hotel buildings on the National Register of Historic Places in West Virginia
National Register of Historic Places in Charleston, West Virginia
Office buildings on the National Register of Historic Places in West Virginia
William Lee Stoddart buildings